Handbuch der Geschichte der böhmischen Länder (Handbook on the History of Bohemian Lands), is a four-volume book, edited by the German historian Carl Bosl from 1967 to 1974 and covering the history of Bohemia, starting from its ancient history to the middle of the 20th century.

References 

 Z. R. Dittrich. Review of Handbuch der Geschichte der Böhmischen Länder. Vol. 1. Die Böhmischen Länder von der archaischen Zeit bis zum Ausgang der Hussitischen Revolution // The Slavonic and East European Review. — 1969. — January (vol. 47, iss. 108). — P. 260–262.
 Manfred Alexander. Review of Handbuch der Geschichte der böhmischen Länder. Band 4: Der tschechoslowakische Staat im Zeitalter der modernen Massendemokratie und Diktatur // Jahrbücher für Geschichte Osteuropas. — 1976. — Bd. 24, H. 1. — S. 118–121.
 Jörg K. Hoensch. Review of Handbuch der Geschichte der böhmischen Länder. In 4 Bänden. Band 2: Die böhmischen Länder von der Hochblüte der Ständeherrschaft bis zum Erwachen eines modernen Nationalbewußtseins // Jahrbücher für Geschichte Osteuropas. — 1976. — Bd. 24, H. 1. — S. 116–118.
 Trevor Vaughan Thomas. Review of Handbuch der Geschichte der Böhmischen Länder. Vol. III: Die böhmischen Länder im Habsburgerreich 1848–1919. Bürgerlicher Nationalismus und Ausbildung einer Industriegesellschaft // The Slavonic and East European Review. — 1970. — July (vol. 48, iss. 112). — P. 460–461.
 F. L. Carsten. Review of Handbuch der Geschichte der Böhmischen Länder. Vol. IV: Der Tschechoslowakische Staat im Zeitalter der modernen Massendemokratie und Diktatur // The Slavonic and East European Review. — 1972. — January (vol. 50, iss. 118). — P. 124–125.
 Robert A. Kann. Review of Handbuch der Geschichte der bohmischen Lander // Central European History. — 1972. — June (vol. 5, iss. 2). — P. 176–179.
 W. V. Wallace. Review of Handbuch der Geschichte der bohmischen Lander, Vol. IV // The English Historical Review. — 1976. — July (vol. 91, iss. 360). — P. 683–683.
 P. G. M. Dickson. Review of Handbuch der Geschichte der Böhmischen Länder // The English Historical Review. — 1981. — July (vol. 96, iss. 380). — P. 652–653.
 H. Mayr-Harting. Review of Handbuch der Geschichte der Böhmischen Länder // The English Historical Review. — 1968. — July (vol. 83, iss. 328). — P. 591–592.
 F. L. Carsten. Review of Handbuch der Geschichte der bohmischen Lander. Vol. II // The Slavonic and East European Review. — 1976. — January (vol. 54, iss. 1). — P. 121–122.

External links 
 

1967 non-fiction books
1974 non-fiction books
German books
History books about World War II
History books about the Middle Ages
History books about the ancient era